Kalograia is a village in the Kyrenia District of Cyprus, east of Kyrenia. It is under the de facto control of Northern Cyprus.

References

Communities in Kyrenia District
Populated places in Girne District